Pachad Yitzchok (or Pachad Yitschak) may refer to:

 Hebrew of "Fear of Isaac", a Biblical reference in Genesis 31:42 (an allusion to God)
 The writings or person of Rabbi Yitzchok Hutner (1906–1980)
 The writings or person of Rabbi Yitzchok Friedman (1850–1917), First Rebbe of Boyan
 Yeshiva Pachad Yitzchok
 A rabbinic encyclopedia authored by Isaac Lampronti (1679-1756)